Rodney ("Rod") Richard (born February 8, 1932) is an American athlete who competed in the 1955 Pan American Games.

At the 1955 Pan American Games he won the gold medal in the 100 metre event as well as in the 200 metre competition. He was also a member of the American relay team which won the gold medal in the 4×100 metre contest.

In 1956 he failed to qualify for the Olympics after finishing seventh in the 100 metre event as well as in the 200 metre competition at the USA Olympic Trials in Los Angeles.

External links
 Profile at trackfield.brinkster.net

1932 births
Living people
American male sprinters
Athletes (track and field) at the 1955 Pan American Games
Pan American Games gold medalists for the United States
Pan American Games medalists in athletics (track and field)
Medalists at the 1955 Pan American Games